The black-and-white seedeater (Sporophila luctuosa) is a species of bird in the family Thraupidae.
It is found in Bolivia, Brazil, Colombia, Ecuador, Peru, and Venezuela.
Its natural habitats are subtropical or tropical moist shrubland, subtropical or tropical high-altitude shrubland, and heavily degraded former forest.

Gallery

References

black-and-white seedeater
Birds of the Northern Andes
black-and-white seedeater
Taxonomy articles created by Polbot